Lone Gaofetoge (born 16 July 2001) is a Motswana footballer who plays as a defender for Geronah and the Botswana women's national team.

References

External links

2001 births
Living people
Botswana women's footballers
Women's association football defenders
Botswana women's international footballers